As a protracted armed conflict spanning more than seven decades, the internal conflict in Myanmar has involved over fifty different armed groups, three military juntas, and seven civilian-led governments.

AFPFL government (1948–1962)

Ne Win's government (1962–1988)

SLORC / SPDC government (1988–2011)

Post-SPDC civilian government (2011–2021)

State Administration Council (since 2021)

See also 
 List of wars involving Myanmar

Notes

References 

Internal conflict in Myanmar